i860 may refer to:
 Intel i860, VLIW RISC microprocessor
 Motorola i860, mobile phone